Fandiño is a Spanish surname. Notable people with the surname include:

Iván Fandiño (1980–2017), Spanish bullfighter
Martha Isabel Fandiño Pinilla (born 1956), Colombian-Italian mathematician
Soledad Fandiño (born 1982), Argentine actress

Spanish-language surnames